The women's shot put event at the 2019 European Athletics Indoor Championships was held on 1 March at 19:02 (qualification) and on 3 March at 12:20 (final) local time.

Medalists

Records

Results

Qualification
Qualification: Qualifying performance 18.20 (Q) or at least 8 best performers (q) advance to the Final

Final

References

2019 European Athletics Indoor Championships
Shot put at the European Athletics Indoor Championships